The 2022 United Nations Biodiversity Conference (COP15) of the Parties to the UN Convention on Biological Diversity (CBD) was a conference held in Montreal, Canada, which led to the international agreement to protect 30% of land and oceans by 2030 (30 by 30) and the adoption of the Kunming-Montreal Global Biodiversity Framework.

History
The conference was originally scheduled to be held in October 2020, but was delayed due to the COVID-19 pandemic. It was rescheduled to be held in April 2022 in Kunming, China, but was postponed again, for a fourth time due to China's zero-COVID policy, to the third quarter of 2022 according to the UN secretariat office on March 29. In May 2022, China requested Canada to assume the host responsibility. The Canadian Minister of Environment and Climate Change Steven Guilbeault met with representatives from the High Ambition Coalition in early June 2022 and these representatives asked Canada to host COP15. The Prime Minister of Canada Justin Trudeau approved the proposal. In June 2022, the UN secretariat for the Convention on Biological Diversity and China's environment ministry said in separate statements that the meeting would be held in December 2022 in Montreal, Canada, where the secretariat is based, though China would remain the president of the summit. While the host countries of previous COPs had one to two years to organize the conference, Canada had just five months to prepare for the arrival of 18,000 delegates from 196 CBD member states, non-governmental organizations, industry groups and academia.

Development

Lead-up
Several cities signed the "Montreal Pledge" in advance of the conference to commit to protect biodiversity in their cities through 15 actions.

Negotiations and adoption
During the talks, divisions remained on numerous issues as the conference went into its final days, such as disputes over the funding for conservation efforts. There was also discussion that protections for marine biodiversity could be dropped completely. An op-ed published in The Guardian in mid-December criticized the proceedings as being very slow and lacking urgency.

On December 19, almost every country on earth signed onto the agreement which includes protecting 30% of land and oceans by 2030 (30 by 30) and 22 other targets intended to reduce biodiversity loss. When the agreement was signed only 17% of land territory and 10% of ocean territory were protected. The agreement includes protecting the rights of Indigenous peoples and changing the current subsidy policy to a one better for biodiversity protection. However, it makes a step backward in protecting species from extinction in comparison to the Aichi Targets. Some countries said the agreement does not go far enough to protect biodiversity, and that the process was rushed. Only the United States and the Holy See did not join it. The absence of the United States signature weakened the agreement. However, the country helped to reach the agreement, strongly advanced some of the targets mentioned in it, especially 30 by 30, nationally and internationally and is a major donor to biodiversity protection issues.

Content
In addition to protecting 30% of land and oceans by 2030, the agreement includes also recovering 30% of earth degraded ecosystems and increasing funding for biodiversity issues. Other targets for the year 2030 include cutting overconsumption and waste, reducing food waste by 50%, and completely stop harming ecosystems that are strongly important for biodiversity. There are also 4 targets for the year 2050 which includes increasing the area of natural ecosystems, restoring their integrity and normal functioning, reducing tenfold the human caused extinction rate, and protecting traditional knowledge.
 
COP15 adopted a comprehensive package of 6 items:

 L25: Kunming-Montreal Global Biodiversity Framework (GBF)
 L26: Monitoring framework for the Kunming-Montreal Global Biodiversity Framework
 L27: Mechanisms for planning, monitoring, reporting and review
 L28: Capacity-building and development and technical and scientific cooperation
 L29: Resource mobilization
 L30: Digital sequence information on genetic resources.

The advocacy of the UNCBD Women's Cacus and its members 
led to a Rio Convention for the first time in its 30-year history to adopt a stand-alone target, Target 23, on gender equality in the Kunming-Montreal Global Biodiversity Framework.

See also
 Global Assessment Report on Biodiversity and Ecosystem Services

References

External links
 COP15: The UN Biodiversity Conference
 The 15th Conference of Parties (COP15) to the Convention on Biological Diversity (CBD) official documents

Biodiversity
Kunming
United Nations conferences on the environment
Convention on Biological Diversity
2022 in the environment
Events postponed due to the COVID-19 pandemic
2022 in international relations
Events in Montreal
Diplomatic conferences in Canada
China and the United Nations
Canada and the United Nations
December 2022 events in Canada
2022 in Quebec